Rene Breitbarth (born 24  April 1966 in Mühlhausen) is a former boxer from East Germany who won a Light Flyweight gold medal at the 1985 European Amateur Championships. In 1986, he won the bantamweight silver medal at the 1986 World Amateur Boxing Championships in Reno. At the 1988 Summer Olympics, he was defeated by Jorge Eliécer Julio of Colombia in the round of 16 of the bantamweight category.

References
sports-reference

1966 births
Living people
People from Mühlhausen
Bantamweight boxers
Olympic boxers of East Germany
Boxers at the 1988 Summer Olympics
German male boxers
AIBA World Boxing Championships medalists
Recipients of the Patriotic Order of Merit in silver
Sportspeople from Thuringia